Spider-Man Family (later retitled The Amazing Spider-Man Family) is a comic book series published by Marvel Comics. It began as a series of one-shots written and penciled by various writers and artists before becoming a bi-monthly ongoing series with the first issue cover-dated February 2007. Its initial writer was  Sean McKeever.  Each issue of Spider-Man Family contained brand new stories featuring Spider-Man and his supporting cast, reprints of classic Spider-Man tales, and an English translation of the original Japanese manga, Spider-Man J.

In June 2008, Spider-Man Family was relaunched as The Amazing Spider-Man Family, and became a showcase title for many of the divergent timelines that were present at this point in the franchise. In addition to strips set in the Brand New Day timeline, a strip exploring the early days of Peter Parker's life as Spider-Man was also included. Another feature, Mr. and Mrs. Spider-Man, written by Tom DeFalco, took  place within Marvel's MC2 continuity. In November 2008, Joe Quesada confirmed on his blog that cult favourite Spider-Girl would be moving to Amazing Spider-Man Family in April 2009.

On July 13, 2009, Marvel announced a new monthly anthology title, Web of Spider-Man, to replace The Amazing Spider-Man Family. Unlike The Amazing Spider-Man Family, it featured only new stories,  with backup stories initially starring Spider-Girl, then switching to Jackpot.

See also
Superman Family
Batman Family
Super-Team Family

External links
 

Spider-Man titles